'Adnan Akbar, born in Mecca is a Saudi fashion designer described as the "Saint Laurent of the Middle East". He studied embroidery in Lebanon and in Karachi. In 1989, he entered a licensing agreement for embroidered luxury fabrics with the French textile company Bianchini Férier. In 1989, he launched a collection of pret a porter which was well received in the United States.

References

External links
 Piney Kesting, Fashioned with Tradition, 1990, Saudi Aramco World

Saudi Arabian fashion designers
People from Mecca
Living people
Year of birth missing (living people)
Embroiderers
20th-century Saudi Arabian people
21st-century Saudi Arabian people